"Butterfly" is a song by American rap rock band Crazy Town. It is based on a sample of "Pretty Little Ditty" from the Red Hot Chili Peppers' 1989 album Mother's Milk, so band members Anthony Kiedis, Flea, Chad Smith, and John Frusciante are credited as writers. The song was released in October 2000 as the third single from their debut album, The Gift of Game. It gained mainstream popularity after being released physically on February 20, 2001. 

"Butterfly" peaked at number one on the US Billboard Hot 100 for two nonconsecutive weeks. Outside of the United States, the song topped the charts in seven countries, including Austria, Denmark, and Norway, and it peaked within the top ten on the charts of several others, including Australia, Canada, the Netherlands, New Zealand and the United Kingdom.

Background and composition
Crazy Town did not choose to release "Butterfly" as the first single from The Gift of Game. Guitarist Kraig "Squirrel" Tyler explained: "We knew all along we didn't want to release 'Butterfly' first because we didn't want to be known as the band that does 'Butterfly'. We are looking at this like we want to have a career. That isn't who we are". In describing the song, frontman Shifty Shellshock said: "Well a song like butterfly is a no brainer everyone seems to love that no matter how hard they are, it's very radio friendly, the female audience loves it and at the same time I think we kept our integrity with it, it's not a sell out song it's very real and cool and I like it".

"Butterfly" was described by George Lang of the Oklahoman as a "a deft blend of hip-hop and rock". Alan di Perna of Guitar World magazine noted Crazy Town were predominantly a rap-metal group, with their music containing the "streetwise guitar rage" of the genre combined with "a dash of Eighties alternative melodicism" and declared the song as a "hip-hop flavored ballad". This was echoed by Tim Kenneally of Spin who noted that the band avoided "descending into rap-metal's typical bitch-done-me-wrong jeremiads"; he declared it a sappy hip-hop love song. Michael Steele, a music director of the pop radio station KIIS-FM, noted the song's crossover appeal in an interview in the Los Angeles Times, declaring that among rap-rock songs, "Butterfly" was "the one that completely crossed over from the rap-rock genre." Spin labelled "Butterfly" as a "nu metal power ballad" and possibly the biggest love song of the entire genre.

Critical reception
It was named the 34th "Most Awesomely Bad Song Ever" by VH1. It was also rated number 3 on Billboards chart for one-hit wonders of the 2000s, compiled in 2009. Spin named "Butterfly" as the 13th best nu metal song. "Butterfly" was featured in Metal Hammer's "The Top 40 Best Nu Metal Songs Ever Made" list and ranked at #18.

Music video
The song's music video, directed by Honey, shows the band in a fantastical forest full of butterflies. Shifty Shellshock and Epic Mazur sing praises to two women with butterfly wings. At one point in the video, Shifty's star-shaped tattoos fly off into the air.

Track listingsUS 7-inch singleA. "Butterfly" – 3:37
B. "Revolving Door" – 3:41US CD and 12-inch singleA1. "Butterfly" (album version) – 3:37
A2. "Butterfly" (Epic remix) – 3:50
A3. "Butterfly" (Extreme mix) – 3:24
B1. "Butterfly" (Jazzy Jim mix) – 3:21
B2. "Butterfly" (instrumental) – 3:37UK CD single "Butterfly" (clean album version) – 3:37
 "Butterfly" (Epic remix) – 3:50
 "Darkside" (clean album version) – 3:53
 "Darkside" (video CD extra)UK cassette single "Butterfly" (clean album version) – 3:37
 "Butterfly" (Extreme mix) – 3:34European CD single "Butterfly" (album version) – 3:37
 "Butterfly" (Extreme mix) – 3:34European maxi-CD single "Butterfly" (album version) – 3:37
 "Butterfly" (Extreme mix) – 3:34
 "Butterfly" (Epic remix) – 3:50
 "Toxic" (explicit album version) – 2:48Australian CD single "Butterfly" (clean album version) – 3:37
 "Butterfly" (Extreme mix) – 3:34
 "Butterfly" (Jazzy Jim mix) – 3:03
 "Butterfly" (Epic remix) – 3:50
 "Only When I'm Drunk" (demo) – 3:04

Credits and personnel
Credits are lifted from the US CD single and The Gift of Game album booklet.Studios Tracked at Westlake Audio (Los Angeles)
 Mixed at Scream Studios (Burbank, California) and The Mix Room (Los Angeles)
 Mastered at Precision Mastering (Hollywood, California)Personnel'

 Shifty Shellshock – lyrics and music (as Seth Binzer), vocals
 Bret Mazur – lyrics and music, vocals, production
 Anthony Kiedis – music ("Pretty Little Ditty")
 Flea – music ("Pretty Little Ditty")
 John Frusciante – music ("Pretty Little Ditty")
 Chad Smith – music ("Pretty Little Ditty")
 Rust Epique – guitar
 Trouble Valli – guitar
 Faydoedeelay – bass
 DJ AM – turntables
 James Bradley Jr. – drums
 Josh Abraham – production, mixing
 Brian Virtue – mixing, engineering
 Tom Baker – mastering

Charts

Weekly charts

Year-end charts

Decade-end charts

Certifications

Release history

See also
 List of Romanian Top 100 number ones of the 2000s

References

External links
 

1999 songs
2000 singles
Crazy Town songs
Billboard Hot 100 number-one singles
Number-one singles in Austria
Number-one singles in Denmark
Number-one singles in Germany
Number-one singles in Greece
Number-one singles in Norway
Number-one singles in Romania
Number-one singles in Switzerland
Song recordings produced by Epic Mazur
Song recordings produced by Josh Abraham
Songs written by Anthony Kiedis
Songs written by Chad Smith
Songs written by Epic Mazur
Songs written by Flea (musician)
Songs written by John Frusciante
Columbia Records singles
Rock ballads
1990s ballads